The Adventures of Captain Zoom in Outer Space is a 1995 science fiction/comedy television film.

This film follows the adventures of 1950s actor Ty Farrell (Riordan), who plays the title character in a Captain Video-like early television program, The Adventures of Captain Zoom in Outer Space.

Plot

On the distant planet Pangea, a transmission of the TV series The Adventures of Captain Zoom in Outer Space is seen by the child genius brother of native forces leader Tyra. Tyra  has been captured by the tyrannical Lord Vox of Vestron whose people, subsequent to some global catastrophe, migrated to the stars from Pangea thousands of years ago and now seeks to recover the lost ancient knowledge of their people.

Lord Vox intends to do this by conquering Pangea, their old homeworld, and with the knowledge, rebuild it as the seat of his empire. In his desperation, Tyra's brother brings Captain Zoom to Pangea with hopes that he can save his sister and defeat the Vestrons. Unfortunately, the actor playing Captain Zoom possess none of the heroic qualities of Zoom but is instead arrogant and egotistical.

Though Captain Zoom is reluctant to lead the natives, his attempts to explain that he is only an actor leads the natives to believe he is a spy because he "is paid to pretend to be other people". He quickly backtracks, pretending that he was testing them, and through various adventures and using his old television stories as inspiration, he leads the natives to a victory by default as Lord Vox is turned into a statue by an ancient guardian.

Cast
 Nichelle Nichols as Sagan, High Priestess of Pangea
 Ron Perlman as Lord Vox of Vestron
 Daniel Riordan as Ty Farrell / Captain Zoom
 Liz Vassey as Princess Tyra, Native Leader of Pangea
 Gia Carides as Vesper, High Priestess of Vestron

Production

Made as a two hour movie in Vancouver by Telvan Prods for the MCA-TV Action Pack. Made  as an action adventure comedy. The design of the ships was partially based on the book focusing on the 1950s Cars Detroit Never Made.  The creators desired to pay homage to Buck Rogers and Flash Gordon. It was hoped the movie would lead to more movies or a series  Perlman said the movie was a lot of fun to make and hoped it led to a series, which was still under discussion in 1998.

Reception

Variety liked the movie, especially the snappy dialogue and the comments made by the actor as it relates to his profession. The special effects were also noted as good, especially as the budget was low. (The budget was $4 million)  Radio Times gave the movie 2 out of 5 stars.

See also 
 Galaxy Quest – a comedy film about aliens that mistake science fiction actors for their characters, parodies Star Trek.
 Redshirts – a comedy novel about life on board a spaceship where wearing a red shirt can prove fatal, parodies Star Trek.
 Diplomatic Act – a comedy novel about a science fiction actor who is mistaken for the character he plays, parodies Babylon 5.
 Three Amigos – a comedy film about three silent film actors who are mistaken for their characters by the people of a small Mexican village.
 My Name is Bruce - A 2007 Supernatural horror/comedy about B-Movie Actor Bruce Campbell encountering an actual supernatural threat that a small town asked him to fight against despite the townspeople themselves not comprehending he's just an actor.

References

External links
 
 
 The Adventures of Captain Zoom in Outer Space Fansite

1995 television films
1990s adventure films
1990s parody films
1990s science fiction comedy films
American adventure comedy films
American science fiction comedy films
American parody films
American space adventure films
American television films
Films scored by Shirley Walker
Films set on fictional planets
1995 comedy films
1995 films
1990s English-language films
1990s American films